If I Didn't Love You may refer to:

 "If I Didn't Love You" (Jason Aldean and Carrie Underwood song)
 "If I Didn't Love You" (Steve Wariner song)
 "If I Didn't Love You" (Tina Arena song)
 "If I Didn't Love You" (Squeeze song)

See also
 If I Loved You